Les Natchez is a romance written by François-René de Chateaubriand, during his exile in England, and printed in 1825–1826. Its subject is the Natchez people, and it contains the author's impressions of America and views of life.

An excerpt from this work was published previously, in 1802, as the novella René.

References

1825 books
Works by François-René de Chateaubriand
French fiction
Natchez